Air Chief Marshal Sir Robert William George Freer,  (1 September 1923 – 15 January 2012) was a Royal Air Force (RAF) officer who served as Deputy Commander of Strike Command from 1978 to 1979.

RAF career
Educated at Gosport Grammar School, Freer joined the Royal Air Force during the Second World War and became a flying instructor. He was given command of No. 92 Squadron in 1955, and became Station Commander of RAF Seletar in Singapore in 1963 during the Indonesia–Malaysia confrontation. He was made deputy director of Defence Plans in 1966, Deputy Commandant of the RAF Staff College, Bracknell in 1969 and Senior Air Staff Officer at Headquarters Near East Air Force in 1971. He went on to be Air Officer Commanding No. 11 Group in 1972, Air Officer Commanding No. 18 Group in 1975 and Deputy Commander of Strike Command in 1978. His last appointment was as Commandant of the Royal College of Defence Studies in 1980 before he retired in 1982.

In retirement he became a Director of Rediffusion. He died at home on 15 January 2012.

Family
In 1950 he married Margaret Tinkler, daughter of John William Elkington of Ruskington Manor; they had one son and one daughter.

References

External links
 Obituary in The Telegraph
 Air of Authority – A History of RAF Organisation – Air Chief Marshal Sir Robert Freer

|-

|-

|-

1923 births
2012 deaths
British military personnel of the Indonesia–Malaysia confrontation
Fellows of the Royal Aeronautical Society
Knights Commander of the Order of the Bath
Knights Grand Cross of the Order of the British Empire
Recipients of the Commendation for Valuable Service in the Air
Royal Air Force air marshals
Royal Air Force personnel of World War II
British people in colonial India
Military personnel of British India